Sarchenar or Sar Chenar or Sar-e Chenar may refer to:
 Sarchenar, Khuzestan
 Sar Chenar, Kohgiluyeh and Boyer-Ahmad
 Sarchenar, West Azerbaijan